Ivor Miles Windsor-Clive, 2nd Earl of Plymouth GCStJ, PC (4 February 1889 – 1 October 1943) was an English nobleman and Conservative Party politician.

Early life
Ivor Windsor-Clive was born on 4 February 1889.  He was the second, and only surviving, son of the Alberta Victoria Sarah Caroline (née Paget) Windsor-Clive and Robert Windsor-Clive, 1st Earl of Plymouth (1857–1923).  He was educated at Eton College and Trinity College, Cambridge.  Until succeeding his father in 1923, he used his father's subsidiary title Viscount Windsor.

His paternal grandfather was Robert Windsor-Clive, himself the son of Harriet Windsor-Clive, 13th Baroness Windsor.  Ivor's mother was the daughter of Sir Augustus Paget, the British Ambassador to Austria-Hungary and descended from the Earls of Uxbridge.

Career
He was member for West St Pancras on London County Council from 1913 to 1919, and was elected as Conservative Member of Parliament (MP) for Ludlow, Shropshire at a by-election in January 1922, holding the seat until he succeeded his father in March 1923. He held office as Captain of the Gentlemen-at-Arms from 1925 to 1929, Parliamentary Under-Secretary of State for Dominion Affairs from January–June 1929, Parliamentary Secretary to the Ministry of Transport from 1931 to 1932, Under-Secretary of State for the Colonies from 1932 to 1936, and as Parliamentary Under-Secretary of State for Foreign Affairs from 1936 to 1939.

He is probably best known for his work as co-chairman of the International Committee for Non-Intervention in the Spanish Civil War.

He was appointed Lord Lieutenant of Glamorgan in 1923, and a Privy Counsellor in the 1929 Dissolution Honours. He was made an Honorary freedom of Cardiff in 1936, served as the charter mayor of the Borough of Barry in 1939, President of the National Museum of Wales and as Pro-Chancellor of the University of Wales 1941.  He was appointed Sub-Prior of the Order of St John of Jerusalem in 1943.

On 12 March 1924 he was appointed Honorary Colonel of the Glamorgan Coast Regiment, Royal Artillery; his father had held the same position with its Victorian predecessor unit.

Lord Plymouth was Chairman of the Royal Commission for Ancient and Historical Monuments in the Principality.

Personal life
On 14 Jul 1921, he was married to Lady Irene Corona Charteris DStJ (1902–1989), the third daughter of Hugo Charteris, 11th Earl of Wemyss and Mary Constance Wyndham, herself one of the three famous Wyndham sisters, all daughters of the Hon. Percy Scawen Wyndham. Together, Ivor and Irene were the parents of:

 Other Robert Ivor Windsor-Clive, 3rd Earl of Plymouth (1923–2018), who married Caroline Helen Rice (1931–2016), granddaughter of Grace Curzon, Marchioness Curzon of Kedleston, in 1950.
 Hon. Richard Archer Alan Windsor-Clive (b. 1928), who married Joanna Mary Woodall, daughter of Edward Corbet Woodall, in 1955. They divorced in 1968 and that same year married Hon. Mary Alice (née Jolliffe) Chancellor (mother of Anna Chancellor), only daughter of William Jolliffe, 4th Baron Hylton. They divorced in 1997.
 Hon. Rowland David Owain Windsor-Clive (1938–1965).
 Lady Gillian Mary Windsor-Clive (d. 1961), who married Wilfred Wooller (1912–1997) in 1941. They divorced in 1947, and that same year married Albertus Jacobus de Haan (d. 1991).
 Lady Clarissa Windsor-Clive (b. 1931), who married Keith Maclean Forbes Egleston in 1953.
 Lady Rosula Caroline Windsor-Clive OStJ (b. 1935), who married Sir Alan Glyn (1918–1998), a Member of Parliament for Clapham, Windsor and Maidenhead, in 1962.

The 2nd Earl of Plymouth died in 1943 aged 54 and was buried in the Windsor-Clive family plot at Tardebigge, Worcestershire. His wife Irene Corona (1902–1989, daughter of the 11th Earl of Wemyss) is buried next to him.  Upon his death, his eldest son inherited an estate valued in excess of £30 million which includes the Oakly Park estate near Ludlow in Shropshire which is in excess of 7,500 acres.

Descendants
Through his son Other, he was the grandfather of Ivor Edward Other Windsor-Clive, 4th Earl of Plymouth (b. 1951); Lady Emma Windsor-Clive; Hon. Simon Windsor-Clive and Hon. David Windsor-Clive.

References

Who Was Who (with corrections)

External links 
 
 

1889 births
1943 deaths
Alumni of Trinity College, Cambridge
Bailiffs Grand Cross of the Order of St John
Windsor-Clive, Ivor
Ivor
Lord-Lieutenants of Glamorgan
Windsor-Clive, Ivor
Members of the Privy Council of the United Kingdom
People educated at Eton College
People associated with the University of Wales
Windsor-Clive, Ivor
Windsor-Clive, Ivor
UK MPs who inherited peerages
Honourable Corps of Gentlemen at Arms
Windsor-Clive
Earls in the Peerage of the United Kingdom
Ministers in the Chamberlain peacetime government, 1937–1939
Deputy Lieutenants of Glamorgan
Younger sons of earls